The University of Pittsburgh Men's Glee Club (also known as the Pitt Men's Glee Club or PMGC) is an internationally recognized men's choir of students at the University of Pittsburgh and is the oldest nonathletic extracurricular group at the University. Founded in 1890 by John L. High, the Glee Club performs at the First Baptist Church of Pittsburgh and normally goes on a concert tour each year, with an international tour every 3rd year. Recently, the Glee Club has performed in areas such as Texas, Philadelphia, New York City, Belgium, France, and a recent 125th anniversary tour of Italy in the spring of 2015.

As of 2023, the club's director is Richard Teaster, who has led the group and its subset, the Pantherhythms, since 1999. The current elected-board of the group for 2022–2023 is Evan Kozierok (President), Joe Breslin (Vice President), Owen May (Secretary) Presley Gerena (Business Manager) and John Levin (Social and Outreach Chair).

Pantherhythms

The Glee Club also has a small subset called the Pantherhythms that meets once a week. Traditionally, it consists of 16 members (4 of each voice part) and performs additional repertoire during Glee Club concerts. The Pantherhythms perform additional concerts as well, including small performances for the Chancellor of the University and at sports events. In November 2015, the group held its first-ever solo concert at Heinz Memorial Chapel.

Recordings
A Musical Tradition, 2008
A Gleeful Christmas, 2008
Lux: A Collection of Sacred Songs and Spirituals, 2011
Cherubini's Requiem in D Minor, 2013
Brothers in Song, 2015

See also
 List of collegiate glee clubs
 University of Pittsburgh
 Hail to Pitt, The University of Pittsburgh's Fight Song.
 University of Pittsburgh Alma Mater, often sung at the beginning or conclusion of PMGC's Concerts.

References

External links
University of Pittsburgh Department of Music
Youtube Channel
PMGC Website

Glee clubs
Musical groups from Pittsburgh
University of Pittsburgh